Sosnowiec may refer to the following places:
Sosnowiec, Piotrków County in Łódź Voivodeship (central Poland)
Sosnowiec, Podlaskie Voivodeship (north-east Poland)
Sosnowiec in Silesian Voivodeship (south Poland)
Sosnowiec, Zgierz County in Łódź Voivodeship (central Poland)
Sosnowiec, Świętokrzyskie Voivodeship (south-central Poland)
Sosnowiec, Greater Poland Voivodeship (west-central Poland)

See also
 Sosnowice (disambiguation)